The 2009–10 ECAC Hockey women's ice hockey season marked the continuation of the annual tradition of competitive ice hockey among ECAC Hockey members.

Pre-season
September 22: St. Lawrence, which has finished among the top three teams in the regular-season standings each year since 2000-01, has been selected to finish in first place in the ECAC in the preseason poll. The voting was done by the league coaches as part of the pre-season polls and all-league team.

The Saints, garnered a total of 107 points, including three of 12 first-place votes. St. Lawrence, boasts returning all-league selection senior defender Britni Smith. Last season, the team finished second in the regular-season standings with a mark of 16-5-1.

Harvard claimed three first-place votes to finish second in the poll. The Crimson earned 103 total points. Harvard is the two-time defending regular-season champion. Dartmouth gained five first place votes, and is slotted to finish third in regular-season play according to the voting. The Big Green compiled 93 points in the poll. Princeton ranks fourth in the preseason poll with 89 points. Clarkson occupies the fifth slot with 85 points, earning one first-place vote. ECAC Hockey Championship runner-up Rensselaer was selected to finish in sixth place, with 74 points.

ECAC pre-season coaches poll

Pre-season All-ECAC team

CIS exhibition

Canadian semipro exhibition

Regular season

Standings

US Olympic exhibition games
On January 3, the ECAC fielded an all-star team to take on the US Olympic Team. Caitlin Cahow (Branford, Conn.), Natalie Darwitz (Eagan, Minn.) and Jocelyne Lamoureux (Grand Forks, N.D.) each tallied two goals in pacing Team USA to victory.

Box scores

October
Oct. 21: Former Harvard player Angela Ruggiero was nominated for the Jefferson Award for Public Service.

November
Nov. 17: For the second consecutive week, Clarkson, Cornell, and Princeton earned spots in the top 10 in the USCHO.com national poll released Monday, November 16 and the USA Today/USA Hockey Magazine Poll released Tuesday, November 17.

December

January

February

March

In season honors
Players of the week
Throughout the conference regular season, Eastern College Athletic Conference offices names a player of the week each Monday.

Offensive players of the week

Defensive players of the week

Rookie of the week

2010 Olympics

Active players
The following active ECAC players represented their respective countries in Ice hockey at the 2010 Winter Olympics.

Former players

Statistical leaders

Post-season

ECAC tournament

ECAC All-Tournament team

NCAA tournament

ECAC awards and honors
March 3: The leagues head coaches have voted for the Best Defensive Forward award. The finalists were named and include the following players: Sarah Parsons (Dartmouth), Britney Selina (Clarkson), Allison Wright (Rensselaer) and Liz Zorn (Cornell).
March 4: Kate Buesser (Harvard), Sarah Parsons (Dartmouth), Catherine White (Cornell) have been named a finalist for the ECAC Player of the Year Award.
March 4: Lauren Dahm (Clarkson), Amanda Mazzotta (Cornell) and Victoria Vigilanti (Quinnipiac) have been named as finalists for the ECAC Goalie of the Year.
March 5: Laura Gersten (Rensselaer), Sarah Parsons, (Dartmouth) and Randi Griffin (Harvard) are the finalists for the ECAC Student Athlete of the Year.

ECAC all-academic team

All-Decade team
The All-Decade team involves players who played in the ECAC between 1999-00 and 2008-09.

First team

Second team

National awards and honors
Dartmouth forward Sarah Parsons, Top 10 Finalist, Patty Kazmaier Award
St. Lawrence defenseman Britni Smith, Top 10 Finalist, Patty Kazmaier Award

See also
National Collegiate Women's Ice Hockey Championship
2009–10 College Hockey America women's ice hockey season
2009-10 Western Collegiate Hockey Association women's ice hockey season
2009–10 NCAA Division I women's ice hockey season
ECAC women's ice hockey

References

ECAC Hockey
ECAC